Sikyátki is an archeological site and former Hopi village spanning  on the eastern side of First Mesa, in what is now Navajo County in the U.S. state of Arizona. The village was inhabited by Kokop clan of the Hopi from the 14th to the 17th century. Jesse Walter Fewkes led a Smithsonian Institution funded excavation of the site in 1895. During the excavations many well-preserved ceramic sherds were found. The designs on the sherds inspired the artist Nampeyo; sparking the Sikyátki revival in polychrome pottery.

Sikyátki, which means "Yellow House" in the Hopi language, according to oral tradition was burned and its population exterminated by the neighboring village of Wálpi. The dispute erupted into violence  when a villager from Sikyátki cut off the head of a sister of a man from Wálpi who had offended him.

References 
 The Destruction of Sikyátki in Hopi Oral Tradition

External links

 Sikyatki (ancestral Hopi) pottery

Hopi
Archaeological sites in Arizona
Buildings and structures in Navajo County, Arizona
Former populated places in Navajo County, Arizona
History of Navajo County, Arizona
Hopi Reservation